Pacarina is a genus of cicadas in the family Cicadidae. There are at least four described species in Pacarina.

Species
 Pacarina championi (Distant, 1881)
 Pacarina puella Davis, 1923 (little mesquite cicada)
 Pacarina schumanni Distant, 1905
 Pacarina shoemakeri Sanborn & M. Heath in Sanborn, M. Heath, Phillips & J. Heath, 2012 (little juniper cicada)

References

Further reading

External links

 

Fidicinini
Cicadidae genera